Sir Gareth Owen Edwards CBE (born 12 July 1947) is a Welsh former rugby union player who played scrum-half and has been described by the BBC as "arguably the greatest player ever to don a Welsh jersey".

In 2003, in a poll of international rugby players conducted by Rugby World magazine, Edwards was declared the greatest player of all time. In 2007, former England captain Will Carling published his list of the '50 Greatest Rugby players' in The Daily Telegraph, and ranked Edwards the greatest player ever, stating; "He was a supreme athlete with supreme skills, the complete package. He played in the 1970s, but, if he played now, he would still be the best. He was outstanding at running, passing, kicking and reading the game. He sits astride the whole of rugby as the ultimate athlete on the pitch".

Edwards was prominent in the Welsh national team that was to the fore in European rugby in the '60s and '70s. He is one of a small group of Welsh players to have won three Grand Slams including Gerald Davies, JPR Williams, Ryan Jones, Adam Jones, Gethin Jenkins and Alun Wyn Jones.

Edwards was appointed a Member of the Order of the British Empire (MBE) in the 1975 Birthday Honours for services to Welsh rugby football; he was promoted to Commander (CBE) in the 2007 New Year Honours, "for services to sport, particularly rugby."
He was knighted in the 2015 Birthday Honours, for services to sport and for charitable services.

Early life

Edwards was born a miner's son in Gwaun-Cae-Gurwen, Glamorgan, Wales. He attended Pontardawe Technical School for Boys (now Cwmtawe Community School), where he was taken under the wing of sports teacher Bill Samuels.

He won a scholarship to the elite Millfield Public School in Somerset. Apart from rugby, Edwards showed promise in a wide range of sports, playing for West Wales Youth soccer team, and signing for Swansea Town at the age of 16. He also showed prowess in gymnastics and athletics.

Playing career

Wales

Edwards won his first international cap for Wales on 1 April 1967 at the age of 19 against France in Paris. Wales lost 20–14 to eventual championship winners France. Between 1967 and 1978 Edwards won 53 caps for Wales, including 13 as captain. All his caps were won in succession; he never had a dip in form or an injury that would allow anybody else to take his place. He scored twenty tries in internationals.

Edwards is Wales's youngest ever captain, first taking the captaincy at the age of 20 in February 1968 against Scotland – a game which the Welsh side won 5–0. Edwards was very fortunate in playing with two of the best outside halves the game has ever seen: Barry John and Phil Bennett. In the early part of his career, Edwards and his club teammate Barry John appeared inseparable, always knowing what the other was doing. During his era the Welsh side dominated the Five Nations Championship, winning the title seven times, including three grand slams. In 1969, Edwards was named Player of the Year in Wales.

In 1974 Edwards was named BBC Wales Sports Personality of the year. He followed up this success by receiving the MBE in 1975.

He was the subject of This Is Your Life in 1976 when he was surprised by Eamonn Andrews.

Edwards' long successful international career came to an end on 18 March 1978 in the same way as he had started his career – against France in the Five Nations Championship. However, unlike on his debut, Edwards celebrated with a 16–7 winning finish in front of a home crowd at the Arms Park in Cardiff. Wales also sealed the Grand Slam and a third consecutive Triple Crown – a record, given that no team had ever won it more than twice in a row. To crown his achievements he was named Rothmans Player of the Year 1978.

British and Irish Lions

Edwards also played ten times for the British & Irish Lions, playing for the 1971 Lions team that was the only such team to win a series in New Zealand, and for the unbeaten 1974 side in South Africa.

Cardiff RFC

He made his debut for Cardiff RFC against Coventry on 17 September 1966 and he played 12 seasons for Cardiff, scoring 69 tries in 195 games.

Other

Edwards also played for Cardiff College, Wales Secondary Schools, East Wales, Wales, Barbarians, Wolfhounds, Irish President XV, World XV in South Africa in 1977, the combined England and Wales against Scotland and Ireland at the RFU centenary in 1971, first Wales Sevens team SRU centenary in 1973, and the RAF (though not in the Services) on tour in Cyprus 1972.

That Try

Edwards' try for the Barbarians against the All Blacks in 1973 at Cardiff Arms Park, often referred to simply as "that try", is regarded as the greatest try ever. The move starts with a deep kick from the New Zealand winger. The ball dropped towards Phil Bennett near to his goal line. Bennett sidestepped and evaded three tackles, in turn passing the ball to JPR Williams. It next passed through four pairs of hands (John Pullin, John Dawes, Tommy David and Derek Quinnell) before Edwards, slipping between two teammates and seemingly intercepting the last pass, finished with a diving try in the left-hand corner.

In a UK poll conducted by Channel 4 in 2002 British rugby supporters voted Edwards's historic try for the Barbarians No. 20 in the list of the 100 Greatest Sporting Moments.

Post-playing career

When he wrote his autobiography he was branded a "professional" and was temporarily prevented from coaching or being involved in any way with the sport of rugby union.

From 1978 until 1982 Edwards was a team captain on the TV quiz show A Question of Sport along with Liverpool and England footballer Emlyn Hughes.

In 1997, Edwards was one of the first fifteen former players inducted into the International Rugby Hall of Fame along with (among others) former playing partners Barry John and JPR Williams. He is also the subject of a plaque in the Rugby Pathway of Fame in the town of Rugby, Warwickshire, which is credited as the home of the game.

On 21 November 2001, Edwards was voted the "Greatest Welsh Player of all time" at a rugby dinner held at the Cardiff International Arena by the 'Welsh Rugby Former International Players' Association' and First Press Events company. Voting took place via the Western Mail, South Wales Echo, Wales on Sunday and the nine Celtic Press titles. The public votes were then sifted by a team of experts and a 'crowd' of almost 1,000 packed into the CIA to discover who were the 'Greatest'.

In a poll of international rugby players conducted in 2003 by Rugby World magazine, Edwards was declared the greatest player of all time. Surprisingly, Edwards has admitted that All Black scrum-half Sid Going most likely got the better of him over their seven encounters, "As I say, he was the best I played against and, yes, he probably had the edge on me in the games we played". Edwards does however think that the pack Going was playing behind may have helped, "...I wouldn't have minded playing with the back row the All Blacks had...then Sid might not have come out on top". He now commentates on the game for the BBC and S4C, commentating for the latter in Welsh, his mother tongue, and he is one of several players to have appeared in the S4C series Rygbi a Mwy. He is also a director at the Cardiff Blues region, director of Mercedes dealership Euro Commercials Ltd. and President of Cardiff Institute for the Blind. A sculpture of Gareth Edwards stands in the St David's Centre, Cardiff.

In 1990 he set a British angling record when he landed a pike weighing 45 lb 6oz at Llandegfedd Reservoir near Pontypool. Edwards held the record for two years. He also enjoys shooting game-birds. Edwards was patron of The Richard Hunt Foundation and in 2010 he was named a Patron of the Jaguar Academy of Sport.

In August 2014, Edwards was one of 200 public figures who were signatories to a letter to The Guardian opposing Scottish independence in the run-up to September's referendum on that issue.

In 2019 he appeared, alongside wife Maureen, in the BBC Series Gareth Edwards’s Great Welsh Adventure. The programme returned for a second series in 2021.

See also
Welsh Rugby Union

References

External links

1947 births
Living people
Barbarian F.C. players
Bards of the Gorsedd
British & Irish Lions rugby union players from Wales
Cardiff RFC players
Commanders of the Order of the British Empire
Knights Bachelor
People educated at Cwmtawe Community School
People educated at Millfield
Rugby players and officials awarded knighthoods
Rugby union players from Pontardawe
Rugby union players from Swansea
Rugby union scrum-halves
Wales international rugby union players
Wales rugby union captains
Welsh rugby union players
World Rugby Hall of Fame inductees